Sorkhabad (also Romanized as Sorkhābād; also known as Surkhābād and Surkhanabad) is a village in Chavarzaq Rural District, Chavarzaq District, Tarom County, Zanjan Province, Iran. At the 2006 census, its population was 262, in 61 families.

References 

Populated places in Tarom County